Jon Purdie (born 22 February 1967) is an English former professional footballer who is currently the coach of Samui United Academy Under-15s.

Career
Purdie started his career at Arsenal, playing in the youth team alongside Tony Adams, Paul Merson and David Rocastle. He moved to Wolverhampton Wanderers in 1985, and went on to make more than 100 appearances for the club, with one manager at Wolves, Sammy Chapman, placing a £1 million price tag on him. Wolves released him shortly after the 1988 Associate Members' Cup Final at Wembley Stadium, for which he was cup-tied. Purdie opted to go part-time with several non-league clubs, a particular highlight coming during a third-round FA Cup tie in 1994 for Kidderminster Harriers against Birmingham City, where his 25-yard shot beat Ian Bennett in the Birmingham goal and put Kidderminster into the fourth-round draw.

Purdie played at Telford United and Worcester City, before turning his hand to management, first managing the youth team before partnering Steve Palmer in 2012 to manage the first team at AFC Wulfrunians. In April 2013, Purdie made a substitute appearance for Wulfs away at Darlaston Town in the West Midlands Regional League Premier Division, on the way to managing Wulfrunians to the title.

Purdie recently published an autobiography.

References

External links

1967 births
Living people
People from Corby
English footballers
Association football wingers
Wolverhampton Wanderers F.C. players
Cambridge United F.C. players
Oxford United F.C. players
Brentford F.C. players
Shrewsbury Town F.C. players
Cheltenham Town F.C. players
Kidderminster Harriers F.C. players
Telford United F.C. players
Worcester City F.C. players
A.F.C. Wulfrunians players
English Football League players
National League (English football) players
English football managers
A.F.C. Wulfrunians managers
Bilston Town F.C. managers